The 1883 Kentucky gubernatorial election was held on August 3, 1883. Democratic nominee J. Proctor Knott defeated Republican nominee Thomas Z. Morrow with 59.97% of the vote.

General election

Candidates
J. Proctor Knott, Democratic
Thomas Z. Morrow, Republican

Results

References

1883
Kentucky
1883 Kentucky elections